Petrocasa ("Oil House") is a type of Venezuelan family houses, built in mass production. These houses are produced since 2007 by Corporación Petroquímica de Venezuela (Pequiven) and are largely utilized in rural areas under the public housing program, Mission Habitat. The houses typically have 70 m² of living space, which is distributed in three bedrooms, two bathrooms, living room, kitchen and dining room. The houses are made of PVC profiles which are assembled locally, and then filled with concrete, steel and iron girders. The walls are self-extinguishing in case of a fire, and resist an attack with nine-millimeter ammunition virtually unscathed. The German Technical Inspection Association (TÜV) Rheinland certified in August 2009 that the PVC used was free of carcinogenic substances.

The homes can be built in 10–12 days. There are currently three factories in Venezuela producing the Petrocasa “kits” in the states of Carabobo and Apure.

In the state of Carabobo, more than 27 thousand people have benefited from the construction of 6,000 homes fabricated from materials originating from the nation’s massive oil industry.

See also 
 Futuro

References

External links
 

Urban planning in Venezuela